Battle of Tarvis may refer to:

 Battle of Tarvis (1797)
 Battle of Tarvis (1809)